Ločil bom peno od valov (I Will Separate the Foam from the Waves) is a novel by Slovenian author Feri Lainšček. It was first published in 2003.

See also
List of Slovenian novels

Slovenian novels
2003 novels